Vyacheslav Podlesnyy (born 21 September 1977 in Pavlodar) is a Kazakhstani sport shooter who competes in the men's 10 metre air pistol. At the 2012 Summer Olympics, he finished 40th in the qualifying round, failing to make the cut for the final.  He also competed in the 50 metre pistol event, finishing 34th and also not qualifying for the final.

References

External links
 
 
 
 

1977 births
Living people
Kazakhstani male sport shooters
Olympic shooters of Kazakhstan
Shooters at the 2012 Summer Olympics
Asian Games competitors for Kazakhstan
Shooters at the 2010 Asian Games
Shooters at the 2014 Asian Games
Kazakhstani people of Russian descent
People from Pavlodar